Miedo or El miedo or variants may refer to:

El Miedo, play by Francisco Tobar García
"El Miedo", poem by Pablo Neruda
Los Miedos, 1980 Argentine horror film
Miedo, 1953 horror film directed by León Klimovsky
"Miedo" (song), by Pablo Alborán, 2011 
"Miedo", a song by Allison, 2017
"Miedo", a song by María Daniela y su Sonido Lasser, 2005
"Miedo", a song by Paulina Rubio from Planeta Paulina, 1996
"Miedo", a song by Pepe Aguilar, 2004